The 2015 Euro Winners Cup was the third edition of Euro Winners Cup, a beach soccer annual tournament, held in Catania, Italy, from 2–7 June 2015. The tournament brought together club champions of many domestic beach soccer leagues across Europe, almost in the same vein as the UEFA Champions League.
Russian team, BSC Kristall won the second straight title.

Participating teams
Twenty-eight teams from 23 countries confirmed their participation in the tournament:

 Catania BS
 Milano BS
 ASD Sambenedettese BS
 Lokomotiv Moscow
 BSC Kristall
 CD Murcia
 CD Bala Azul
 KP Łódź
 Hemako Sztutowo
 SC Braga
 FC Vybor
 Goldwin Plus Bodon FC
 Amrahbank
 Sable Dancers Berna
 LSA Chaudfontaine
 FC BATE Borisov
 FC Odesos
 BS Bohemians 1905
 Portsmouth BS
 BSC Peugeot Estonia
 Montpellier BS
 Dinamo Batumi
 BST Chemnitz
 Mani BS Club
 Ushkyn-Iskra
 CS Djoker - Tornado Chișinǎu
 AS Constanța
 Antalya - Alanya BSC

Group stage
According to the draw realized on May 262teams were divided in a group stage with seven groups of 4 teams, then the two best ranked sides of each group, and the best overall two third-ranked sides will advance to the round of 16.

Group A

Group B

Group C

Group D

Group E

Group F

Group G

Play-off

Bracket

5th–8th places

Winners

Awards

Final standings

See also
Beach soccer
Beach Soccer Worldwide

References

External links
Beach Soccer Worldwide

Euro Winners Cup
Euro
2014
Sport in Catania
2015 in beach soccer